Thielaviopsis is a small genus of fungi in the order Microascales, and family Ceratocystidaceae. The genus includes several important agricultural based pathogens. The most widespread is T. basicola, the causal agent in several root rot diseases of economically important crop species including cotton and a variety of vegetables. In cotton, Thielaviopsis causes root rot, also known as black root rot, which causes necrosis of the roots and stunting of the crop plants.

The genus name of Thielavia is in honour of Friedrich Joachim Sigismund von Thielau (1796–1870), who was a German forester and landowner in Breslau.

Species
As accepted by Species Fungorum;
Thielaviopsis abuensis 
Thielaviopsis cerberus 
Thielaviopsis ethacetica 
Thielaviopsis musarum 
Thielaviopsis populi 
Thielaviopsis radicicola 
Thielaviopsis wallemiiformis 

Former species; (assume family Ceratocystidaceae if not mentioned)
T. australis  = Davidsoniella australis
T. basicola  = Berkeleyomyces basicola
T. eucalypti  = Davidsoniella eucalypti
T. euricoi  = Ceratocystis euricoi
T. neocaledoniae  = Davidsoniella neocaledoniae
T. neocaledoniae  = Davidsoniella neocaledoniae
T. ovoidea  = Chalaropsis ovoidea
T. paradoxa  = Ceratocystis paradoxa
T. paradoxa var. musarum  = Thielaviopsis musarum
T. punctulata  = Thielaviopsis radicicola
T. quercina  = Ceratocystis fagacearum
T. thielavioides  = Ceratocystis paradoxa
T. ungeri  = Chalara ungeri, Pezizellaceae

References

Microascales
Fungal plant pathogens and diseases
Sordariomycetes genera